The Athens Polytechnic uprising occurred in November 1973 as a massive student demonstration of popular rejection of the Greek military junta of 1967–1974. It began on 14 November 1973, escalated to an open anti-junta revolt, and ended in bloodshed in the early morning of 17 November after a series of events starting with a tank crashing through the gates of the Athens Polytechnic.

Background 

The first massive public action against the Greek junta came from students on 21 February 1973, when law students went on strike and barricaded themselves inside the buildings of the Law School of the University of Athens in the centre of Athens, demanding repeal of the law that imposed forcible conscription.

An anti-dictatorial student movement was growing among the youth, and the police utilised brutal methods and torture towards them, in order to confront the threat.

November events 

On 14 November 1973, students at the Athens Polytechnic (Polytechneion) went on strike and started protesting against the military junta (Regime of the Colonels). As the authorities stood by, the students were calling themselves the "Free Besieged" (Greek: Ελεύθεροι Πολιορκημένοι, a reference to the poem by Greek poet Dionysios Solomos inspired by the Ottoman siege of Mesolonghi). Their main rallying cry was:

An assembly formed spontaneously and decided to occupy the Polytechnic. The two main student parties, the Marxist pro-Soviet A-AFEE and Rigas did not endorse the movement. A Coordination Commission of the Occupation was formed but had loose control over the uprising. Police had gathered outside but did not manage to break into the premises.

During the second day of the occupation (often called celebration day), thousands of people from Athens poured in to support the students. A radio transmitter was set up and Maria Damanaki, then a student and member of A-EFEE, popularized the slogan "Bread-Education-Freedom". The demands of the occupation were anti-imperialistic and anti-NATO. Third parties that allied themselves with the student protests were the construction workers (who set up a parallel committee next to CCO) and some farmers from Megara, who coincidentally protested on the same days in Athens.

A proclamation was announced on Friday, 16 November by the CCO that the students were aiming to bring down the Junta. During the afternoon, demonstrations and attacks against neighbouring ministries took place. Central roads closed, fires erupted and Molotov cocktails were thrown for the first time in Athens. Students barricaded themselves in and constructed a radio station (using laboratory equipment) that repeatedly broadcast across Athens: 

In the early hours of November 17, 1973, the transitional government sent a tank crashing through the gates of the Athens Polytechnic. Soon after that, Spyros Markezinis himself had the task to request Papadopoulos to reimpose martial law.

An official investigation undertaken after the fall of the Junta declared that no students of the Athens Polytechnic were killed during the incident. Total recorded casualties amount to 24 civilians killed outside Athens Polytechnic campus. These include 19-year-old Michael Mirogiannis, reportedly shot to death by officer Nikolaos Dertilis, high-school students Diomedes Komnenos and Alexandros Spartidis of Lycee Leonin, and a five-year-old boy caught in the crossfire in the suburb of Zografou. The records of the trials held following the collapse of the Junta document the circumstances of the deaths of many civilians during the uprising, and although the number of dead has not been contested by historical research, it remains a subject of political controversy. In addition, hundreds of civilians were left injured during the events.

Legacy 

An annual march commemorates the uprising. In 1980, after the government prevented marchers from passing by the American embassy in Athens, police killed two protesters.

The student's struggle also had a lasting effect on Greek anarchism. Despite the anarchists relatively minor influence in the uprising itself, their unfulfilled vision became a rallying cry for Greek anarchists internally. The now-defunct far-left organization Revolutionary Organization 17 November is named after the last day of the Polytechnic uprising.

See also 
 History of Modern Greece
 Athens Polytechnic March of 1980

Citations

Sources

Further reading

External links 
 The boy who braved the tanks
 Athens by Night

1973 protests
Resistance to the Greek junta
1973 in Greece
Conflicts in 1973
Protests in Greece
Riots and civil disorder in Greece
Student strikes
Student protests in Greece
Modern history of Athens
1970s in Greek politics
Occupations (protest)
November 1973 events in Europe
20th century in Athens